Lofton Henderson Memorial Bridge (formerly, 21st Street Bridge) is a cantilever truss bridge that carries Ohio State Route 611 (Henderson Drive) over the Black River in Lorain County, Ohio.

The High-Level Bridge was proposed in 1937 as a bypass to the notoriously congested Erie Avenue swing bridge. Designed by Wilbur J. Watson & Associates of Cleveland and constructed by the American Bridge Company, it opened in conjunction with the new Erie Avenue bascule bridge on September 26, 1940. The High-Level Bridge was named for Lofton Henderson in October 1991.

See also

Further reading

 Lofton Henderson Memorial Bridge at Bridges & Tunnels

References

1939 establishments in Ohio
Bridges in Lorain County, Ohio
Road bridges in Ohio